Muhwagwa (무화과, Fig Tree) is a 1935 Korean film directed by Na Woon-gyu. It premiered at the Woomikwan theater.

Plot
This film is a melodrama in which Yun Bong-Choon stars as a violinist in love with a dancer played by Jeon Choon-woo. Their relationship is ruined by the interference of a rich man, played by Lee Bok-bun.

References

External links 
 Images from Muhwagwa at The Korean Film Archive (KOFA)

See also
 Korea under Japanese rule
 List of Korean-language films
 Cinema of Korea

1935 films
Pre-1948 Korean films
Korean black-and-white films
Films directed by Na Woon-gyu
1935 drama films
Melodrama films